By 1915 the US Army was using trucks tactically, for World War I it began purchasing in large numbers. Early trucks were often designed for both military and commercial use, later military-specific designs were built. Since 1940 the US military has ordered over 3,000,000 tactical trucks. The US Marines have used both US Army and their own specific models, some are shown.

The "ton" (907 kg) weight ratings are the payload of a basic cargo version of the truck, not of the individual version.
 
The "wheel arrangement" designation is the number of wheels x the number of driven wheels. There are two wheels per axle, dual tires are counted as one wheel. Some series have both single and dual tire models.

"Total built" usually includes for US forces and any export orders.

1915

1930

1940
In 1939-1940 the US Army Ordnance Corps was developing a complete line of tactical trucks that could operate off-road in all weather. These trucks are named after their type followed by their manufacturer and model. Early use of "M" numbers relate to the body and not the truck itself. During WWII "M" numbers began to be used for new truck models. In 1945 all truck production ended.

1950
In 1950 the next generation of tactical trucks were being developed. Trucks were military standard designs, 6x6 trucks used common cabs and similar fender and hood styles.

1960

1970

1980
In the 1980s truck series began to be named from the initials of the truck type and are widely known by these names.

1990

2000

See also

List of U.S. military vehicles by model number
List of U.S. military vehicles by supply catalog designation

Notes

References

Further reading

Military trucks of the United States